Gary David Carlsen (born May 12, 1945, in Ashland, Kentucky) is a retired male discus thrower from the United States. He represented his native country at the 1968 Summer Olympics in Mexico City, where he ended up in sixth place in the overall-rankings. Carlsen is best known for winning the gold medal in the men's discus event at the 1967 Summer Universiade and at the 1967 Pan American Games.

References

1945 births
Living people
American male discus throwers
Athletes (track and field) at the 1967 Pan American Games
Athletes (track and field) at the 1968 Summer Olympics
Olympic track and field athletes of the United States
Sportspeople from Ashland, Kentucky
Pan American Games medalists in athletics (track and field)
Pan American Games gold medalists for the United States
Universiade medalists in athletics (track and field)
Universiade gold medalists for the United States
Medalists at the 1967 Summer Universiade
Medalists at the 1967 Pan American Games